Worldwide Angel is the second mixtape by Spanish singer and songwriter Bad Gyal. It was released on 23 February 2018 by Puro Records and Canada Editorial.

A 10-minute version of the album, mixed and edited by Rudeteo, was released along with the album on Bad Gyal's YouTube channel.

Critical reception

Philip Sherburne of Pitchfork stated that Worldwide Angel "largely sticks to the template established on previous Bad Gyal songs: synth-heavy, sticky-sweet dembow grooves tinged with airy melancholy", and "is clearly meant to signal [her] arrival as a global force." Sherburne found her melodies "often about as emphatic as a shrug", and noted that her lyrics "seem hesitant to stray far from themes she's already explored."

Track listing
Credits adapted from Tidal and other sources.

Personnel
Credits adapted from Tidal and other sources.

 Alba Farelo – primary vocals
 Faberoa – featured vocals (track 6)
 El Guincho – production (tracks 1–2, 4); mixing
 Jam City – production (tracks 1–2)
 Dubbel Dutch – production (tracks 2–3, 5)
 Fakeguido – production (tracks 4, 6, 9)
 Faberoa – production (track 6)
 Florentino – production (track 7)
 D33J – production (track 8)
 Paul Marmota – production (track 9)
 Vlado Meller – mastering
 Alejandro Sonoro – artwork

Charts

Weekly charts

Year-end charts

Release history

References

2018 mixtape albums
Albums produced by D33J
Albums produced by el Guincho
Albums produced by Jam City
Albums recorded in a home studio
Bad Gyal albums
Canada Editorial albums
Catalan-language albums
Dancehall albums
Reggaeton albums
Spanish-language albums